Dumitru Unchiașu (born 6 July 1951) is a Romanian former football defender.

Notes

References

1951 births
Living people
Romanian footballers
Association football defenders
Liga I players
FC Petrolul Ploiești players
ASA Târgu Mureș (1962) players
FC Politehnica Iași (1945) players
People from Târnăveni